The badminton Mixed doubles tournament at the 2014 Asian Games in Incheon took place from 25 September to 29 September at Gyeyang Gymnasium.

Schedule
All times are Korea Standard Time (UTC+09:00)

Results
Legend
WO — Won by walkover

Final

Top half

Bottom half

References

External links
Official website

Badminton at the 2014 Asian Games